Holly A. Cork  (born March 8, 1966,  in Savannah, Georgia) is an American politician, and a former member of the South Carolina State Senate, representing District 46 from 1992 to 1999. Cork was succeeded by Scott Head Richardson.  At the time of her election in 1992, she and Sherry Shealy Martschink were the only women in the South Carolina Senate.

In September 1996, Cork requested an opinion from the South Carolina Attorney General about a referendum to establish a local-option sales tax to fund a highway construction project.

Cork graduated from the University of South Carolina in 1988 and worked as a Legislative Assistant for Congressman Arthur Ravenel Jr. for a year before winning the South Carolina House of Representatives District 123 seat, where she served from 1989 to 1992. Cork was preceded in the seat by her father William Neville Cork II, who died in 1989, and succeeded by Scott Head Richardson.

References

External links 
 Appearances on C-SPAN

South Carolina state senators
Women state legislators in South Carolina

1966 births

Living people

Women in the South Carolina State Senate